Future Vintage is the fifth studio album by American hip hop group ¡Mayday!. Pre-release, Wrekonize illustrated that "This album sums up everywhere we've been and is a link between everything we've done and where we're trying to go." The album was released on September 18, 2015, by Strange Music.

Singles
The first single for Future Vintage, "Fuel To The Fire" was released on July 14, 2015. Two weeks later, on July 28, 2015, the second single "Ten Thirty Three" was released. Just under a month later, on August 26, 2015, "Something In The Air" was released. The final single released before the album was "Against My Better Judgement" on September 9, 2015.

Reception
The album received generally positive reviews and charted on the US Billboard 200 with a peak position of 112. David Jeffries from AllMusic gave Future Vintage a 4 out of 5 stars and stated that "Broken hearts, bad vibes, and slow ballads are all over Future/Vintage, but as ¡Mayday! grow older, they prove they're capable of tackling these topics and tones while maintaining the power and the punch of their early days." Andrew Buckner of Swurv Radio reviewed the album and expressed that "It all comes together to equate both a mammoth achievement and a certified masterpiece." In a sum up of 2015 Hip-Hop, Cassidy Kakin of TeamBackpack praised Future Vintage and asserted that it "helped define 2015 hip-hop, and it offers a recipe for a way forward."

Track listing

Charts

References

2015 albums
¡Mayday! albums
Strange Music albums